State decorations of the Kosovo are regulated by the Law on Decorations. Decorations are divided into three grades: orders, medals and commemorative medals. The President also bestows the title of Honorary Ambassador of Kosovo to people who have made extraordinary contributions to the Republic of Kosovo. This is an honor bestowed very rarely with only nine recipients in the history of the Republic.

The orders, decorations and medals are awarded by the President of Kosovo, though nominations might come from: Chairman of the Assembly, Prime Minister, President of the Supreme Court and the Electoral College, Chief Prosecutor of Kosovo, Minister, Chief of General Staff, General Director of Kosovo Police, President of the Municipal Assembly, President of the Academy of Sciences and Arts.

Honorary Titles
 Honorary Ambassador of Kosovo

Orders
  Hero of Kosovo Order
   Order of Freedom
  The Order of Independence

Medals
    Presidential Medal of Merits (Medalja Presidenciale e Meritave) or Presidential Military Medal (for military personnel)
  Medal of Merit (Minister of Internal Affairs)
  Medal of Merit of the Red Cross of Kosovo (bronze, silver ad gold versions)

Recipients
Order of freedom
 Donald Trump
Joe Biden

Medalja Presidenciale e Meritave:
 Dua Lipa
 Richard Grenell
 Robert O'Brien
Ruggiero Capodivento
World Bank
Jonathan Saiger (https://www.mcc.gov/news-and-events/release/release-022123-saiger-kosovo-presidential-award)

Military
 Military Medal for Service in Kosovo

See also
Orders and medals of Federal Republic of Yugoslavia

Notes

References

External links

Evidence of the decorated by presidents over the years